Juan de Montiel (died 23 December 1657) was a Roman Catholic prelate who served as Bishop of Santiago de Cuba (1655–1657).

Biography
Juan de Montiel was born in Ocón, Spain.
On 14 May 1655, he was appointed during the papacy of Pope Alexander VII as Bishop of Santiago de Cuba.
On 16 July 1656, he was consecrated bishop by Francisco Diego Díaz de Quintanilla y de Hevía y Valdés, Bishop of Antequera. 
On 30 August 1656, he was installed as Bishop of Santiago de Cuba where he served until his death on 23 December 1657.

References

External links and additional sources
 (for Chronology of Bishops)  
 (for Chronology of Bishops) 

17th-century Roman Catholic bishops in Cuba
Bishops appointed by Pope Alexander VII
1657 deaths
Roman Catholic bishops of Santiago de Cuba